Radjindernath "Edu" Nandlal (born 1963) is a Surinamese former professional footballer. During his career, he played for Dutch clubs FC Utrecht, FC Emmen and Vitesse Arnhem. He was one of the footballers that survived the Surinam Airways Flight PY764 air crash in Paramaribo on 7 June 1989, however he was partially paraplegic and was in a wheelchair for 1½ years. In 2001, Nandlal started his own cleaning company.

Further reading

References

Living people
Sportspeople from Paramaribo
Dutch footballers
Surinamese footballers
Surinamese emigrants to the Netherlands
Eerste Divisie players
FC Utrecht players
FC Emmen players
SBV Vitesse players
Survivors of aviation accidents or incidents
Surinamese people of Indian descent
1963 births
Dutch people of Indian descent
Sportspeople of Indian descent
Association football defenders